Chief Enyinna Nwigwe  is a Nigerian actor, producer, and entrepreneur. He is best known for playing Nonso in The Wedding Party 2, and playing Tamuno in Black November.

Early life and education 
Nwigwe was born and raised in Ngor Okpala, in Imo State to Nigerian parents. He studied at the University of Calabar and holds a degree in Economics.

Career 
Nwigwe began his career as a print and runway model before transitioning to professional acting.

His first feature was in a 2004 film, Wheel of Change,

In 2012, he joined the cast of Black November opposite actors Kim Basinger, and Vivica A. Fox, Akon, and Wyclef Jean. In 2017, he played the lead role in the South African movie, All About Love which won the best film, Southern Africa, at the AMVCA.
In 2019, Nwigwe played the role of Obinna Omego in the remake of the Nigerian film, Living in Bondage: Breaking Free, and also played the role of Nura Yusuf in Nigeria's first military-based film, Eagle Wings. Nwigwe also played the lead in Badamasi, a biopic on the former military President of Nigeria. He got the Best Actor in a Leading Role nomination at the Africa Movie Academy Awards, for his portrayal of President Ibrahim Badamasi Babangida in the film.

Nwigwe's portrait by Nigerian-American photographer Iké Udé was selected to permanently be on exhibition at the Smithsonian Institution's National Museum of African Art.

Personal life 
Nwigwe lives in Lagos, Nigeria. He is a Nigerian Chief.

Filmography

Film

Television

Awards and nominations

References

External links 
 

Igbo male actors
Male actors from Imo State
21st-century Nigerian male actors
University of Calabar alumni
Living people
Nigerian male film actors
Year of birth missing (living people)
Nigerian male television actors
Nigerian film producers